is a passenger railway station in located in the city of Hannan, Osaka Prefecture, Japan, operated by West Japan Railway Company (JR West). Located near Asahiyama and the border with Sennan, Izumi-Tottori is on the JR Hanwa line. The Hanwa line serves the mountainous inland areas of municipalities and suburban areas between Wakayama city and Osaka city proper.

Lines

Station layout
The station consists of two side platforms built in an embankment, with the station building underneath. The station is staffed.

Platforms

History
Izumi-Tottori Station opened on 1 April 1963. With the privatization of the Japan National Railways (JNR) on 1 April 1987, the station came under the aegis of the West Japan Railway Company.

Station numbering was introduced in March 2018 with Izumi-Hashimoto being assigned station number JR-R49.

Passenger statistics
In fiscal 2019, the station was used by an average of 2156 passengers daily (boarding passengers only).

Surrounding Area
 Tamadayama Park
Osaka Prefectural Izumi Tottori High School
Hannan City Tottori Higashi Junior High School

See also
List of railway stations in Japan

References

External links

 Izumi-Tottori  Station Official Site

Railway stations in Osaka Prefecture
Railway stations in Japan opened in 1963
Hannan, Osaka